The 1967 FIBA World Championship for Women(Czech: Mistrovství světa FIBA žen v roce 1967) was hosted by the Czechoslovakia from 1967. The Soviet Union won the tournament, defeating South Korea 83-50 in the final.

Preliminary round

Group A

|}

Group B

|}

Group C

|}

Classification round

|}

Final round

|}

Final standings

Awards

References
Results 

FIBA Women's Basketball World Cup
FIBA
FIBA
FIBA
FIBA World Championship for Women
Women's basketball in Czechoslovakia